Death with reprieve is a criminal punishment found in the law of the People's Republic of China. According to the criminal law chapter 5 (death penalty), sections 48, 50 and 51, it gives the death row inmate a two-year suspended sentence of the execution. The convicted person will be executed if found to have committed further crimes during the two years following the sentence; otherwise, the sentence is automatically reduced to life imprisonment or a fixed-term imprisonment if the person is found to have performed deeds of merit during the two years.

Unlike pardon (clemency), in which the relief of the penalty is decided after the death penalty has been pronounced, reprieve is pronounced directly in place of the death sentence to the prisoner who has committed the potentially capital crime.

Chinese courts hand down this form of sentencing as frequently as, or more often than, actual death sentences. This unique sentence is used to emphasize the seriousness of the crime and the mercy of the court, and has a centuries-old history in Chinese jurisprudence. Scholars reported that in the context of the post-2007 death penalty reform in China, a considerable number of prisoners who would previously be subject to the death penalty by immediate execution have been diverted to the suspended death penalty regime. 

After The Amendment (IX) to the Criminal Law of the People's Republic of China in 2015, courts may act according to the circumstances for criminals charged with bribery or "plundering the public treasury", possibly issuing a sentence without the possibility of a reduction to fixed-term imprisonment or of parole when the sentence was automatically reduced to life imprisonment (such as Bai Enpei). 

Thus, once the two-year suspension of execution has expired, a sentence of "death with reprieve without commutation or parole" will automatically be reduced to life imprisonment regardless of any deeds of merit performed during the two years, meaning the offender will spend the rest of their life in prison.

See also
Capital offences in China
Death recorded
Reprieve

References

Chinese law
Capital punishment in China

de:Todesstrafe#Volksrepublik China